The Ivchenko AI-9 is an aircraft auxiliary power unit developed and produced by Ivchenko-Progress and Motor Sich.

Variants 
AI-9 The base model which is used to supply compressed air to air-start systems. It can also be used as cabin heating if necessary.
AI-9V A variant of the base model that is used to supply compressed air to air-start systems and air conditioning. It also supplies electricity to on-board electrical systems with a 3 kW generator.
AI9-3BThe AI9-3B is used to provide air to engines and air conditioning systems and provide electricity to on-board electrical systems.

Specifications (AI-9)

References

Ivchenko-Progress aircraft engines
Aircraft auxiliary power units